Königstein im Taunus is a health spa and lies on the thickly wooded slopes of the Taunus in Hesse, Germany. The town is part of the Frankfurt Rhein-Main urban area. Owing to its advantageous location for both scenery and transport on the edge of the Frankfurt Rhine Main Region, Königstein is a favourite residential town. Neighbouring places are Kronberg im Taunus, Glashütten, Schwalbach am Taunus, Bad Soden am Taunus and Kelkheim.

Geography

Neighbouring communities 
Königstein borders – from northwest to east – on the communities of Glashütten, Schmitten, Oberursel, and Kronberg (all four in the Hochtaunuskreis), and from southeast to southwest on Schwalbach, Bad Soden and Kelkheim (all three in the Main-Taunus-Kreis).

Constituent communities 
Besides the main town, which bears the same name as the whole, Königstein has three outlying centres: Falkenstein, Mammolshain and Schneidhain. Since 2001, Falkenstein has borne the designation  (health spa) independently of the town's status as such.

History 

Shrouded in legend, the town's founding date is unknown. The name 'Königstein' means 'King stone'. The local legend states that King Chlodwig (466-511), founded the town after building a castle on a hill as well as a chapel.

Königstein had its first documentary mention in 1215, making it likelier that the castle was built around the 12th century for the town's – and the Frankfurt-Cologne commercial road's – security.

Also in that time came the town's first lords, the Counts of Nürings, but they were supplanted in 1239 by the Lords of Hagen-Münzenberg into whose ownership the castle went as an Imperial fief. The Lords of Hagen-Münzenberg were in turn followed by the Lords of Bolanden-Falkenstein from 1255 to 1418, under whose rule Königstein was granted town rights in 1313. The Lords of Bolanden-Falkenstein were succeeded by the Lords of Eppstein, who were themselves followed by the Counts of Stolberg in 1535. It was they who introduced the Reformation to the area.

By 1581, Königstein belonged to the Electorate of Mainz, which had incorporated the old County through a legal dispute. Early in the 17th century, in connection with the Counterreformation, the castle was remodelled into a mighty fortress, but this newer military stronghold met its end in the French Revolutionary Wars when the French blew it up in 1796, although this may have been unintentional. (Local legend has it that gunpowder was hidden in the castle's well, and a spark from a careless French soldier's pipe started the explosion).

In 1803, Königstein passed to the Principality of Nassau-Usingen, which itself later merged with Nassau-Weilburg to form the Duchy of Nassau. By 1866 it was in Prussian hands, and since 1945, it has been part of Hesse. The three constituent communities mentioned herein were amalgamated with Königstein as part of Hesse's municipal reforms in 1972.

Königstein enjoyed an economic upswing from less wealthy times when the coldwater spa first opened in 1851. It reached its high point just before the First World War broke out. The designation  was granted in 1935, and is still borne by the town, and now also independently by the constituent community of Falkenstein.

Jewish health resort and summer residence of the Frankfurt Jews 

Königstein was regarded as a "Jewish spa" – this was especially in the era of National Socialism a topic. The city became famous as "Jewish spa" mainly due to the high proportions of Jewish guests (for example Otto Klemperer, Kurt Hahn, Carl Sternheim, Botho Graef, Reinhold Lepsius), who stayed in the internationally famous sanitarium Dr. Kohnstamm (the name stuck even after the death of the founder Oskar Kohnstamm in 1917) and Hotel Cahn, which offered kosher food. For these reasons, Königstein was an attractive city to visit for a day trip for many Jews in Frankfurt. Königstein became even more easily accessible from Frankfurt am Main in 1902, when the railway between Königstein and Frankfurt was built.

Königstein was also the residence of prominent Jewish citizens (for example Mathilde Hannah von Rothschild, Sigmund Kohn-Speyer, L. Albert Hahn, Hermann Wronker, Albert Katzenellenbogen, Julius Blau, Max Neisser, Adolf Sabor, Selmar Spier, the family of Richard Musgrave), who in turn brought their friends and guests there. The poet Stefan George, e.g., initially often visited his school friend Oskar Kohnstamm, and then after Kohnstamm's death in 1917 and the sale of Kohnstamm's sanatorium, moved to Königstein to be near his sister, Anna George. In her apartment he received members of the George circle for which special rooms had been rented. These include for example the poet Ernst Morwitz, with whom he went for long walks. George's and Kohnstamm's honored school friend Karl Wolfskehl had contacts to the Sanatorium Dr. Amelung, whose director had been a friend of Oskar Kohnstamm.

After Kohnstamm's death in 1917 until 1938 the owner of the renowned Kohnstamm sanatorium was Carl Frankl (also Jewish). Carl was a brother of the famous World War I fighter pilot Wilhelm Frankl (his brother Wilhelm had converted from Judaism to Christianity in order to marry his high school sweetheart).
While in 1937, 24 hotels, hostels and guest houses still refused to do so and accepted Jewish guests, the following year, in 1938, all 54 hotels, hostels and guest houses in Königstein complied with Nazi law and added the following sentence to their advertisements: "All the guest houses are run Jew-free."

Königstein's mayor in 1938 commented on the reputation of Königstein as Jewish spa town in the context of public discussions of a suggested continued existence with the Jewish name kept of the Sanatorium Dr. Kohnstamm instead of the Aryanization preferred by the mayor himself, that (should the name be kept) "the reputation of Königstein as ‘Jews' resort' would yet again be cemented in an irreparable way".

Even after the Holocaust famous people of Jewish descent settled in Königstein. Thus, e.g. Max Dessoir moved here for his retirement (he had lived there once before previously in the 'Sanatorium Amelung'), as did Hedwig Fischer (née Landshoff), the wife of publisher Samuel Fischer. Both Hedwig Fischer and Max Dessoir spent the rest of their lives in Königstein. Paulette Goddard, Charlie Chaplin's wife, was a famous visitor of Königstein after World War II.

Politics 
Represented on town council are the CDU, the SPD, the FDP and the Greens, as well as the ALK, a citizens' coalition. At the moment, Königstein is governed by an informal alliance of ALK and the CDU.

Coat of arms 
Königstein's civic coat of arms was conferred in 1907. It is based on a town seal from 1535. The towers stand for the old Imperial Castle. The Lords of Bolanden-Falkenstein are remembered in the red and gold field in the upper right (upper left heraldically speaking), as are the Counts of Nürings in the black lion, and indeed the Lords of Eppstein in the three chevrons.

Economy

Purchasing power 
Königstein has an extraordinarily high level of purchasing power. In 2010, their purchasing power index was of 191 percent (compared to the national average of 100 percent) and with that the highest in Germany.

Transport 

Königstein is advantageously placed for driving. By way of Federal Highways B8 and B455, which meet in town at a roundabout, Autobahnen A 66 (Frankfurt-Höchst interchange), A 661 (Oberursel interchange) and A 3 (Niedernhausen interchange) can be reached in a matter of minutes. Königstein's advantageous placement, however, brings problems, too. Rush hour traffic, both in the morning and evening, regularly results in heavy traffic jams on the way into the roundabout.

The nearest airport is Frankfurt International Airport.

By way of the Königstein Railway ( – FKE) and bus routes connecting the towns to the S-Bahn stations at Bad Soden (S 3) and Kronberg (S 4), Königstein is connected to Frankfurt Central Station and the whole railway network run by the Rhein-Main-Verkehrsverbund (Rhine-Main Transport Association, RMV), and it has at its disposal Königstein station and Schneidhain station.

Established businesses 
Königstein im Taunus is an attractive place for business. The citizens' above-average buying power is a boon to local retail businesses, the range of which is correspondingly great. Furthermore, there are quite a few independent business and personnel consultants, often former managers from industry. Through the takeover of the well known German personnel consultancy Hofmann Herbold & Partner, Königstein was for years headquarters to the biggest international executive search firm Korn/Ferry. Several spinoffs brought into being by former Korn/Ferry employees are still in business in town now.

The Commerzbank maintains a large training and conference centre at the edge of town, which is also available to third parties. The Deutsche Bank also has one between Falkenstein and Kronberg.

Town partnerships 

Königstein im Taunus maintains partnerships with the following towns:
 Le Cannet-Rocheville, France
 Königstein, Saxony
 Kórnik, Poland
 Le Mêle-sur-Sarthe, France (with Falkenstein)
There is also a friendship agreement with:
 Königstein in the Upper Palatinate

Culture and sightseeing

Regular events 
The greatest folk festival in Königstein is the yearly , or Castle Festival, at the Königstein Castle ruins. Moreover, early in the year, and in the summer, further events also take place there:  ("Knights' Tournament"),  ("Theatre at the Castle"), as well as various musical and film events. Since 2005 also a series of concerts called  ("Middle Ages rock the castle").

As well, business in the outlying communities is shaped by many festivals and activities.

Clubs 

The  ("Knights of Königstein") have committed themselves to the Middle Ages and since 1998 have been staging a yearly Knights' Tournament with a mediaeval market at Königstein's picturesque castle ruins. The local young people who do this are supported in this endeavour by the club  ("Town Watch").

Furthermore, each of Königstein's constituent communities has its own sport or football club. Moreover, the club has at its disposal 21 youth teams. Also, the SG ( or "playing community") Schneidhain and FC Mammolshain play Football (soccer) in Königstein, both, however, at lower levels.

From 5 to 16 June 2006, on the occasion of the 2006 FIFA World Cup, the Brazil national team made its home at the Kempinski Hotel in Falkenstein, a five-star hotel originally built as an officers' retreat for Kaiser Wilhelm. The team trained at the "Altkönigblick" sport ground,  usual facility.

Königstein also has, from singing clubs to a mandolin club, a karate and tennis club, and a volunteer fire brigade in every constituent community, more than 100 clubs.

Buildings 

Besides the town's landmark, the Königstein Castle ruins, other buildings are worth seeing, such as the historic Old Town with its Old Town Hall (Rathaus), and Falkenstein Castle, and the Old Town also found there. Nearby there is a viewpoint called Dettweiler-Tempel, named after physician Peter Dettweiler, specialised in pulmonology, who helped establishing Falkenstein as a spa town. The viewpoint allows a look over parts of Falkenstein as well as of Frankfurt and its surrounding area. 
Built in 1891 by Frankfurt Banker Albert Andreae de Neufville, it was transformed into a boarding school (Schülerheim) in the post-war years (1957–1987). Thoroughly restored, it became famous as Jürgen Schneider's headquarters from 1987 until his multi-billion-Deutsche-Mark bankruptcy in 1994.

The health spa, built in 1977, was controversial at the time because of its blue-orange colour scheme.

The Villa Rothschild, built in 1888 as a summer residence for Wilhelm Carl von Rothschild, was used in 1948 and 1949 as a conference venue by the Conference of Ministers-President to resolve disputed questions between the allied military governors and the Parlamentarischer Rat. Today it is used as a Hotel.

Königstein is likewise well known for its idyllic Old Town. Its exclusive residential areas (also in Falkenstein) are mainly marked by Art Nouveau and its -influenced offshoots as well as 1960s Chic (bungalows). Lot sizes, however, are not comparable to those in other towns owing to new town planning and the building plans following therefrom.

Museums 
The Castle and Town Museum is found at the historic Old Town Hall

Education

Schools 
There are in Königstein various schools, among them three Gymnasien: the state Taunusgymnasium (formerly Taunusschule), the private St. Angela Schule and the private Bischof-Neumann-Schule.

Primary schools 
Grundschule Königstein
Grundschule Falkenstein
Grundschule Mammolshain
Grundschule Schneidhain
Kid's Camp Königstein

Secondary schools 
 Taunusgymnasium Königstein, Gymnasium
 Friedrich-Stoltze-Schule, Hauptschule and Realschule
 Bischof-Neumann-Schule, private school, state-recognized
 St.-Angela-Schule, private school, state-recognized

Philosophisch-Theologische Hochschule Königstein (1949–1978) 
On 29 April 1949, a Königstein Philosophical-Theological College was founded in Königstein as a self-standing Catholic university, and acknowledged by the Hessian state government.

Bishop Maximilian Kaller – who was the first bishop with special authority over ethnic Germans who had been driven out of lost German territories at the end of the Second World War – appointed philosophy professor Erich Kleineidam to the new institution in late May 1947 as a professor. In 1948, he also became head of the seminary, and in 1949 rector of the Königstein Philosophical-Theological College. Besides Kleineidam, others who taught at the ecclesiastical university were Anton Janko, Philipp Schäfer and Leo Scheffczyk. Among well known graduates were Karl Gabriel, Johannes Gründel and Gerhard Pieschl.

The college produced 417 priests. It was dissolved on 15 February 1978.

Literature 
For three years, from 1970 until his death in 1973, the writer and journalist Herbert Kranz (born 4 October 1891 in Nordhausen; died 30 August 1973 in Braunschweig) lived here.

The book  ("Königstein im Taunus: History and Art") by Beate Großmann-Hofmann and Hans-Curt Köster (Königstein im Taunus 2010 ) offers a detailed outline of the town's history, its castle and its outlying communities. It also includes a detailed catalogue of many buildings and objects worthy of protection.

Also of importance is the book  ("Jews in Königstein") by Heinz Sturm-Godramstein. The former town archivist's documentation first appeared in 1983 and was reissued in 1998 almost unchanged.

Sundry

Health 
There is in Königstein a comprehensive offering of health services. Besides the baths, there are various clinics, among them a migraine clinic, a special clinic for psychosomatic illnesses, a heart clinic and a neurological clinic. The two spas of Königstein and Falkenstein have recently formed the entrance portal to Germany's first climatic healing park.

Famous Personalities 
 Adelheid-Marie of Anhalt-Dessau (1833 – 1916)
 Max Dessoir (1867–1947) psychologist and art historian
 Franz Halder (1884–1972) Wehrmacht general
 Eduard Maurer (1886–1969) chemist and metallurgist (developed V2A stainless steel)
 Herbert Karl Ludwig Kranz (1891–1973) writer
 Walter Christaller (1893–1969) geographer
 Eugen Kogon (1903–1987) political scientist, writer, Antifascist
 Richard Musgrave (1910–2007) economist
 Leo Cardinal Scheffczyk (1920–2005)
 Jürgen Schneider (1934– ) building speculator
 Volker Reiche (1944– ) comic strip artist
 Birgit Friedmann (1960– ) athlete
 Christoph Neubronner (1960– ) jazz pianist
 Hans Zimmer (1957– ) film composer and Oscar winner
 Father Werenfried van Straaten (1913–2003) called "Speckpater" ("Bacon Father"); founder of the international relief organization Aid to the Church in Need
 Michael Gross (1964– ) Swimmer, three-time Olympic gold medal winner
 Eva Pfaff (1961– ) tennis player
 Charly Körbel (1954– ) soccer player
 Jürgen Hardt (1963– ) German Politician, Christian Democratic Union member of the Bundestag

References 

History and Coat of arms have their own sources.

External links 

Königstein

Hochtaunuskreis
Spa towns in Germany